Rhoda Njobvu (born 29 January 1994) is a Zambian athlete who specializes in sprinting.

Athletics career 
Njobvu gained her first international experience at the 2014 Commonwealth Games in Glasgow, where she was eliminated from the 400m with 57.47 seconds in the first round. In 2016, she made it to the semi-finals at the African Championships in Durban in the 200m. At the 2018 African Championships in Asaba, Delta, she again reached the semi-finals, this time in the 100m, in addition, she won the bronze medal in the 4x400m relay, setting a national record in the process with 3.38.18s.

In May 2021, she competed at the World Athletics Relays in Chorzów, Poland. She and her colleagues missed the finals after running 44.81 s in the preliminary round in May 2021.

In 2021 she posted a personal best at the 100m, which at 11.12 was briefly the leading time in the world, tied with Tiana Wilson before it was beaten by Nzubechi Grace Nwokocha. It also secured her spot at the delayed 2020 Tokyo Olympics. Shortly afterward, she increased her record over 200m to 22:69 improving Kabange Mupopo's previous national record from 2017 by almost half a second, and qualified for the 200m at the 2020 Summer Olympics as well. Njobvu did not reach the semi-finals at the Olympics in either event. Njobvu ran both events at the 2022 Commonwealth Games and reached the semi-finals in the 200m race where she finished fourth in her race running 23.72 seconds and had the fourteenth fastest time overall.

Statistics

Personal best 

 Information from World Athletics profile unless otherwise noted.
 100 Meter: 11.12 s (-0.5 m/s), 20 March 2021 in Lusaka NR
 200 Meter: 22.69 s (-0.2 m/s), 10 April 2021 in Lusaka NR

References

External links 

 

1994 births
Living people
Zambian female sprinters
Sportspeople from Lusaka
Athletes (track and field) at the 2014 Commonwealth Games
Commonwealth Games competitors for Zambia
Olympic athletes of Zambia
Athletes (track and field) at the 2020 Summer Olympics
Athletes (track and field) at the 2022 Commonwealth Games